The 1971–72 Midland Football League season was the 72nd in the history of the Midland Football League, a football competition in England.

Clubs
The league featured 15 clubs which competed in the previous season, along with three new clubs:
Eastwood Town
Gateshead
Kimberley Town

League table

References

External links

Midland Football League (1889)
M